The Social Democratic Party/Jant Bi (Parti social-démocrate) is a political party in Senegal. 
At the legislative elections of 3 June 2007, the party won 23.93% of the popular vote and 26 out of 150 seats.

References

Political parties in Senegal
Social democratic parties